Cenal power station is a 1320-megawatt coal-fired power station in Turkey in Çanakkale Province, which burns imported and local coal. The plant was financed by Turkish banks and is owned by Cengiz Holding and Alarko Holding and receives capacity payments. Environmentalists, such as Greenpeace, attempted to stop construction with protests, and legal action against the environmental impact assessments. Cenal is on the Global Coal Exit List. It is estimated that closing the plant by 2030, instead of when its licence ends in 2062, would prevent over 4000 premature deaths.

References

External links 

 Cenal power station on Global Energy Monitor

Coal-fired power stations in Turkey